Stadion Miejski w Elblągu (English: Municipal Stadium in Elbląg) is a football stadium in Elbląg, Poland. The stadium is used by the Olimpia Elbląg football club.

External links
 Info about the stadium on the e-olimpia webpage

Elbląg
Buildings and structures in Elbląg
Sport in Elbląg
Elbląg